Dactylocnemis pacificus, the Pacific gecko or Pacific sticky-toed gecko, is a species in the family Gekkonidae, endemic to the North Island and offshore islands of New Zealand. D. pacificus is the only described species in the genus Dactylocnemis, but five offshore island forms may represent new species.

References

External links
 Pacific gecko, at New Zealand Herpetological Society
 Dactylocnemis pacificus (Gray, 1842) at the Reptile Database
 Hoplodactylus pacificus - Pacific gecko, photos at Ryan Photographic

Diplodactylidae
Endemic fauna of New Zealand
Reptiles of New Zealand
Taxa named by Franz Steindachner
Monotypic lizard genera
Endemic reptiles of New Zealand